"Dancing in the Sheets" is a song written by Bill Wolfer and Dean Pitchford and recorded by American R&B group Shalamar. It was featured on the chart-topping soundtrack album of the 1984 motion picture Footloose and was also the first single from their album Heartbreak, featuring the new line-up of Howard Hewett, Delisa Davis and Micki Free. A music video was made featuring the new line-up and did not feature any footage from the film.

"Dancing in the Sheets" was a top 20 hit on the Billboard charts, peaking at No. 17 on the Hot 100 and reaching No. 18 on the Hot Black singles chart. On the UK Singles Chart, the song climbed to No. 41.

An extended 12" version of the song was made available as one of four bonus tracks on the 15th Anniversary Collectors' Edition re-release of the soundtrack in 1998.

Personnel
Bill Wolfer - synthesizer
David Williams - guitar
Micki Free - guitar
Howard Hewett - vocals, background vocals

Charts

Weekly charts

Year-end charts

References

Songs about dancing
Shalamar songs
1984 songs
1984 singles
Songs written by Dean Pitchford
Songs from Footloose
Columbia Records singles